Sonny DiChiara (born July 29, 1999) is an American baseball first baseman who plays in the  Los Angeles Angels organization.

Amateur career
DiChiara grew up in Hoover, Alabama and attended Hoover High School.

DiChiara began his collegiate career at Samford. He was named the Southern Conference Freshman of the Year after hitting 21 home runs and driving in 55 runs. DiChiara was batting .328 before the 2020 season was cut short due to the coronavirus pandemic. As a junior, he batted .273 and led the Southern Conference with 18 home runs. After the season DiChiara transferred to Auburn.

DiChiara entered his senior season at the Tigers' starting first baseman. He was named the Southeastern Conference Co-Player of the Year at the end of the season, sharing the award with Louisiana State University’s Dylan Crews.

Professional career
DiChiara was selected in the fifth round of the 2022 Major League Baseball draft by the Los Angeles Angels. He was assigned to the Double-A Rocket City Trash Pandas to start his professional career.

References

External links

Samford Bulldogs bio
Auburn Tigers bio

1999 births
Living people
Baseball first basemen
Auburn Tigers baseball players
Samford Bulldogs baseball players
Rocket City Trash Pandas players
People from Hoover, Alabama